Masumabad-e Fenderesk (also Romanized as Ma‘şūmābād-e Fenderesk; also known as Ma‘şūmābād) is a village in Katul Rural District, in the Central District of Aliabad County, Golestan Province, Iran. At the 2006 census, its population was 850, in 203 families.

References 

Populated places in Aliabad County